Orrin Thomas Upshaw (July 23, 1874 – August 15, 1937) was an American tug of war athlete who competed in the 1904 Summer Olympics. In the 1904 Olympics he won a silver medal as a member of Southwest Turnverein of Saint Louis No. 1 team. He was born in WaKeeney, Kansas and died in St. Louis, Missouri.

References

External links
profile

1874 births
1937 deaths
Olympic silver medalists for the United States in tug of war
Olympic tug of war competitors of the United States
Tug of war competitors at the 1904 Summer Olympics
Medalists at the 1904 Summer Olympics
People from WaKeeney, Kansas